is an indoor speed skating oval located in Akita, Akita, Japan. The first indoor skating rink in Akita Prefecture was located near Prefectural Gymnasium.

Rinks
Speed skate rink - 333.3m☓13m, 4,367.74 m2
Ice hockey rink - 60m☓30m, 1,789 m2

Events
 National Sports Festival of Japan (1979)
2001 World Games - Artistic roller skating, Roller hockey, Inline speed skating

Track records
500 m (m): Shun Ono (37,99)
500 m (w): Shoko Fusano (42,18)
1000 m (m): Jun Yuda (1.16,79)
1000 m (w): Shoko Fusano (1.27,23) 
1500 m (m): Takayuki Sato (2.01,95)
1500 m (w): Kanako Iijima (2.11,77) 
3000 m (m): Satoshi Obara (4.13,43)
3000 m (w): Kanako Iijima (4.39,86) 
5000 m (m): Yasuhiro Shimizu (7.20,30)

References

Location map

Buildings and structures in Akita (city)
2001 World Games
Artistic roller skating at the 2001 World Games
Curling venues in Japan
Indoor arenas in Japan
Indoor ice hockey venues in Japan
Speed skating venues in Japan
Indoor speed skating venues
Sports venues in Akita Prefecture
Sports venues completed in 1971
1971 establishments in Japan